Bare Knuckles is a 1921 American silent drama film directed by James P. Hogan and starring William Russell, Mary Thurman and George Fisher.

Cast
 William Russell as 	Tim McGuire
 Mary Thurman as Lorraine Metcalf
 Correan Kirkham as Fern
 George Fisher as 	Haines
 Edwin B. Tilton as Benham
 Charles Gorman as 	Lweek
 Jack Roseleigh a 	Harris
 John Cook as 	Old Soaky
 Joe Lee as Abie
 Charles K. French as 	Metcalf
 Jack Stevens as 	Shadow

References

Bibliography
 Connelly, Robert B. The Silents: Silent Feature Films, 1910-36, Volume 40, Issue 2. December Press, 1998.
 Munden, Kenneth White. The American Film Institute Catalog of Motion Pictures Produced in the United States, Part 1. University of California Press, 1997.

External links
 

1921 films
1921 drama films
1920s English-language films
American silent feature films
Silent American drama films
American black-and-white films
Films directed by James Patrick Hogan
Fox Film films
1920s American films